Achyra massalis, the ombava, is a moth of the family Crambidae. The species was described by Francis Walker in 1859. It is found in most of the Old World tropics, including Réunion, Namibia and Australia (including New South Wales, Queensland and Western Australia).

Adults have light to dark brown forewings with a submarginal dark band and a dark spot near the centre.

The larvae are considered agricultural pests and have been recorded feeding on pearl millet (Pennisetum glaucum). They are off white, greenish or reddish and have three dark red lines along the body. They only feed at night. By day they rest in a web in the soil near the host plant.

Taxonomy
It is sometimes listed as a synonym of Achyra coelatalis.

References

Lepidoptera of West Africa
Moths described in 1859
Moths of Africa
Moths of Australia
Pyraustinae
Taxa named by Francis Walker (entomologist)